The 1906 North Leitrim by-election was held on 28 February 1906 after Patrick Aloysius McHugh resigned.  McHugh had been elected for the Irish Parliamentary Party in the 1906 general election for both North Leitrim and North Sligo.  As he could only take one seat he chose North Sligo, so creating a vacancy.

The seat was retained by Charles Dolan who stood for the Irish Parliamentary Party.  The by-election was uncontested.

References

By-elections to the Parliament of the United Kingdom in County Leitrim constituencies
1906 elections in the United Kingdom
1906 elections in Ireland